Henri Fursy or Furcy (real name Henri Dreyfus, 26 February 1866 - 14 April 1929) was a French cabaret singer, director and lyricist.

Life

Henri Dreyfus was born on 26 February 1866 in the 3rd arrondissement of Paris.

Under the stage name of Henri Fursy, he was a chansonnier, a singer of humorous songs, in Montmartre. 
He also directed several cabarets as a manager or owner, including the famous Le Chat Noir (The Black Cat), 
which he bought after the death of Rodolphe Salis and renamed La Boîte à Fursy (The Fursy Box).
He also wrote songs for several Parisian artists of the early 20th century.

Henri Fursy was made a Knight of the Legion of Honour in 1927.
He died in Nice on 14 April 1929.
Albert Michaud published a tribute  after his death in Le Cornet (The Horn) where he says Fursy left a young widow and an adopted girl.
He is buried in the cemetery of Montparnasse.

Bibliography
 Chansons rosses, Ollendorff, 1898, cover illustration by Léandre. 
 Chansons rosses, part 2, Ollendorff, 1899, cover illustration by Gründ. 
 Chansons de La Boîte (chansons rosses, part 3), Société d'éditions littéraires et artistiques, 1902.  
 Chansons rosses, part 4, Ollendorff, 1905.

References
Citations

Sources

Writers from Paris
1866 births
1929 deaths
French chansonniers
French lyricists
19th-century French male singers
Burials at Montparnasse Cemetery
French male singer-songwriters